Prema Tharangaya (Sinhala, Love Contest) is a 1953 Sri Lankan film directed by A. B. Rajj and produced by S. M. Nayagam. The film stars Aruna Shanthi and Ayesha Weerakoon in lead roles along with Hugo Fernando, Mark Samaranayake and Laddie Ranasinghe in supportive roles. Music was directed by R. Muttusamy. The musician Dharmadasa Walpola debuted as a playback singer in this film.

Plot 
Love story of Premadasa and Mallika.

Cast
 Aruna Shanthi as Premadasa
 Ayesha Weerakoon as Mallika
 Hugo Fernando as Walpola Mudalali
 Mark Samaranayake as Wickrama
 Laddie Ranasinghe as Gunasiri
 Richard Albert as Tarzan
 Dharma Sri Ranatunga
 Latha Walpola
 Girley Gunawardana as Dancer
 Benedict Fernando as Teacher
 David Dharmakeerthi
 Nancy Dias as Piyasili
 Jemini Kantha as Podihamy
 Devika Rani as Mariyan

Songs 

"Sama Malin Ron Soyan" – Latha Walpola and chorus
Hitha Sanasene" – Rudrani
"Pasal Jeevithe"
"Dahasa Diley"
"Pera Kala Pawa Pala Di" – Dharmadasa Walpola
"Ho Hada Di" – Latha Walpola
"Darunu Gini Dalewi" – Latha Walpola
"Ugathu Wiyathu" – Latha Walpola
"Sapatha Siwarage" – Dharmadasa and Latha Walpola
"Hoda Hodama Weya Lowa" – Dharmadasa and Latha Walpola
"Mey Loke Wasi" – Haroon Lanthra
"Wali Wadeney Wena Giye" – Hugo Fernando and Rudrani

References

1953 films
Sri Lankan black-and-white films